Reggae Gold 1998 is a compilation album of reggae artists released in 1998. The album spent 82 weeks on Billboard's Reggae Album chart after debuting at #1. Reggae Gold also spent 8 weeks on the Billboard 200.

Track listing
 "She Nuh Ready Yet" - Spragga Benz
 "Gal Pon de Side" - Frisco Kid
 "Tell Me" - Beenie Man
 "Infiltrate" - Sean Paul
 "Cry for Die For" - Bounty Killer
 "Heads High" - Mr. Vegas
 "Babylon Ah Listen" - Sizzla
 "Destiny" - Buju Banton
 "Sweep over My Soul" - Luciano
 "Boom Boom" - Degree
 "We Nuh Like" - Spragga Benz
 "Tight up Skirt" - Red Rat
 "Bad Man Nuh Dress Like Girl" - Harry Toddler
"Hold On" - Beres Hammond
"Going Away" - Beenie Man, Sanchez
"Don't Follow Rumours" - Carlton Livingston, Shabba Ranks

References

1998 compilation albums
Reggae compilation albums